Ottonian architecture is an architectural style which evolved during the reign of Emperor Otto the Great. The style was found in Germany and lasted from the mid 10th century until the mid 11th century.

History
Ottonian architecture draws its inspiration from Carolingian and Byzantine architecture.  Ottonian architecture also draws from Christian art. This style of architecture is an example of a combination of Christian architecture as well as Germanic and Mediterranean styles. Apart from some examples influenced by the octagonal Palatine Chapel at Aachen such as Ottmarsheim (11th century, Alsace) and the apse of the abbey of the Holy Trinity at Essen, religious architecture tends to diverge from the centralised plan. Inspiration though from the Roman basilica remains concurrent, and Ottonian architecture preserves the Carolingian double ended feature with apses at either end of the church.

Ottonian architecture, especially in the creation of churches, are influenced by the Roman basilica. The churches from this era feature long naves and apses.The architectural engineering of their buildings relied heavily on mathematics, which can be seen in how Ottonian structures measurements are calculated by square unit and in how symmetrical the interior and exterior layouts are. A distinct feature of this style are thin strips on the outer walls of buildings made out of stone. This design feature was derived from Italy and Roman architectural styles. This can be especially seen churches from this period and is typically just used as a design feature. In the Ottonian and Carolingian churches, the use of several altars, transepts, as well as crypts became more prominent.  Ottonian architecture plays a role in the rituals of the Holy Roman Empire, such as the coronations of Emperor's.  Brother of Otto the Great, Bruno the Great, worked to design, construct as well as reconstruct many buildings in the Ottonian architectural style. For example, churches such as St. Martin, St. Gereon, St. Cecilia, and St. Pantaleon were all projects he had influence and worked on as well as many more.

Examples
Saint Pantaleon's Church, Cologne
St Bartholomew's Church, Liège, Belgium.
Church of St. Gertrude, Nivelles, Belgium (1046)
Church of St. Michael, Hildesheim, Germany (1010–33)
Abbey Church of Gernrode (960–965, apparently the first in Europe to have a tribune gallery)

See also
Ottonian art
Ottonian Renaissance
:Category:Ottonian architecture

References 

 
A
Medieval German architecture
German architectural styles
 
Architectural history
Architectural styles
Medieval architecture